Binary Code is the fifth extended play by South Korean boy group Oneus. It was released by RBW and distributed by Kakao Entertainment on May 11, 2021.

Background and release 
The EP contains the lead single "Black Mirror", a rock version of their debut song "Valkyrie", and three new tracks. Group member Ravn co-wrote the lead single "Black Mirror".

Puah Ziwei, writing for NME, noted that the lead single "Black Mirror"'s music video "seem to draw inspiration from the late Michael Jackson" and the "lyrics also reference a number of the late pop icon’s hits, including 'Bad' and 'Man In The Mirror'."

Commercial performance
The EP ranked at number 2 for the weekly Gaon Album Chart and number 4 for the monthly chart. The EP sold 103,240 copies in South Korea by the end of June 2021.

Critical reception
In addition, Black Mirror has been listed as one of the 'The Best K-Pop Tracks of 2021' by Dazed. Dazed stated "'' There’s the slap of funk bass and washes of strings, elements that comprised the backbone of 1979’s Off The Wall, but ONEUS’s composers have recalibrated the analogue into a cool, impersonal sheen of digital production. It’s a canny twist; a thumping, computerised nu-disco backdrop for the song’s flesh and blood lament – the loss of human connection within the technological age."

Year-end lists

Track listing

Charts

Album

Weekly charts

Monthly charts

Songs

Weekly charts

Release history

Certification and sales

References 

2021 EPs
Korean-language EPs
Oneus albums